Cyperus spectabilis is a species of sedge that is native to southern parts of North America, Central America and parts of South America.

See also 
 List of Cyperus species

References 

spectabilis
Plants described in 1827
Flora of Mexico
Flora of Arizona
Flora of Argentina
Flora of Bolivia
Flora of Costa Rica
Flora of Guatemala
Flora of Honduras
Flora of Peru
Flora of Texas
Taxa named by Johann Heinrich Friedrich Link